Carcross station is a railway station in Carcross, Yukon, Canada. It serves the White Pass and Yukon Route heritage railway. The station is the northernmost terminus for passenger railway services on the line, with connecting bus services to Whitehorse, Yukon.

The building was designated a national heritage railway station in 1991.  The building was originally built in 1910 for the White Pass & Yukon Railway, being in service from 1910 until 1982.  Service was later re-instated in 2007.

See also
 List of designated heritage railway stations of Canada

References

Railway stations in Yukon
Railway stations in Canada opened in 1910
Designated Heritage Railway Stations of Canada